Old Berkeley County Courthouse, also known as Old Courthouse, is a historic courthouse located at Mount Pleasant, Charleston County, South Carolina. It was built in 1884, and is a two-story, rectangular, stucco over brick building in the Italianate style.  It features large matching double stairways leading to the main entrance on the second floor. The building served as county courthouse for Berkeley County from 1884 to 1898. After 1898 until 1968, it was used by both Baptists and Lutherans as a church. It is now known as the G. Mcgrath Darby Building.

It was listed on the National Register of Historic Places in 1971 and is located in the Mount Pleasant Historic District.

References

County courthouses in South Carolina
Courthouses on the National Register of Historic Places in South Carolina
Victorian architecture in South Carolina
Government buildings completed in 1884
Buildings and structures in Charleston County, South Carolina
National Register of Historic Places in Charleston County, South Carolina
Historic district contributing properties in South Carolina
Mount Pleasant, South Carolina